Kirkby railway station is situated in Kirkby, Merseyside, England. The station is an interchange between Merseyrail services from Liverpool Central and Northern services from Manchester Victoria via Wigan Wallgate.  It is situated 7.5 miles (12 km) north-east of Liverpool Central and is the operational terminus of both the Kirkby branch of Merseyrail's Northern Line and the Kirkby Branch Line from Wigan.

History

The original station was built in 1848, as part of the Liverpool and Bury Railway (later part of the Lancashire and Yorkshire Railway system). The station was situated on the western side of the bridge that bisects the site and consisted of two platforms. The L&BR subsequently became part of the main L&YR route between Manchester Victoria &  and prior to the 1923 Grouping carried fast expresses between the two cities in addition to sizeable volumes of local passenger traffic and freight. After the nationalisation of the railway network in 1948, the use of the line as a through Liverpool to Manchester route declined but local commuter traffic levels remained significant (19 trains per day each way ran along the line in 1965, though a few ran non-stop between Liverpool & Wigan). Nevertheless, this did not stop the station & line from being listed for closure in the 1963 Beeching Report (along with the neighbouring Liverpool to  commuter line).  The closure plans were subsequently rejected by the government in December 1967 and the station then became part of the newly created Merseyside Passenger Transport Executive's rail network in 1969.

1970s
From the following year, the line through the station was singled to reduce track maintenance costs, with the Wigan-bound platform being taken out of use.

It was then rebuilt in 1977, when the line from Liverpool was electrified.  Electric operations commenced on 2 May of that year, along with the end of through running between Bolton/Wigan and Liverpool.

The station configuration was altered due to the closure of the terminus at Liverpool Exchange on 30 April 1977. Its replacement with new underground stations at  & Central meant that the diesel services from Manchester,  & Wigan serving the station could no longer operate beyond  as diesel multiple units were banned from operating in the new tunnels for safety reasons.  In order to maintain a through service to the city, the section from Walton Junction to Kirkby was third-rail electrified, with the remainder of the line towards  and Wigan remaining diesel operated. The station at Kirkby became the interchange point between the two. Electrification eastwards from Kirkby was deemed too expensive at the time.

The modern station consists of a single platform on either side of the road overbridge, with a ticket office and waiting room at street level. The single track is broken up by a large buffer stop, which separates the electric Merseyrail trains from the diesel-run Northern services. Passengers wishing to go from one to another must walk a dozen yards or so along the platform to move between trains (a similar layout exists at Ormskirk).

Accidents and incidents

On 27 June 1857, a goods train collided with an excursion train stopped at Kirkby. More than 200 people were injured, some of them severely. The driver and guard of the goods train were found to be at fault for the incident, having not reacted to an adverse signal in a timely fashion despite clear weather and good visibility. The report also found that the Lancashire and Yorkshire Railway had neglected to make best use of available safety measures.

In 1987, a Class 508 electric multiple unit collided with the buffer stop.

In 1991, a passenger train collided with the buffer stop.

In 1997, Class 507 electric multiple unit 507 031 collided with the buffer stop.

2021 train crash

The train impacted a concrete structure separating the Merseyrail tracks from the Kirkby Branch Line and was derailed, causing some damage to the platform. Twelve people sustained minor injuries. Services at the station were interrupted due to the need to remove the train and assess and repair damage on both sides of the buffer stops, with rail replacement buses running until the end of March. An investigation by the British Transport Police revealed that the driver had been using his mobile phone whilst driving, and entered the station at excessive speed. He pleaded guilty to a charge of endangering passengers on the railway.

Facilities
The ticket office is staffed throughout the day, from start of service until 00:30 seven days per week.  A self-service ticket machine is also provided.  There are shelters on both sides of the split platform, along with digital display screens and timetable poster boards.  Step-free access to the platform is available via ramp. There is a 174 space car park and secure cycle parking for 20 cycles.

Services
Services to Liverpool Central operate frequently, running every 15 minutes during the day (Monday-Saturday) and every 30 minutes at other times with a Saturday service operating on most Bank Holidays. The last train to Liverpool is at 23:13.

Services to Wigan Wallgate and Manchester Victoria operate less frequently, usually once per hour (with one p.m peak extra). There is no evening service after 19:46 or Sunday service but a normal service operates on most Bank Holidays. Some trains continue beyond Manchester Victoria, to either  and  via The Calder Valley line.

Headbolt Lane extension

As part of the second Merseyside Local Transport Plan (covering expansion of public transport in the region from 2006 to 2011),  plans were drawn up for the expansion of the electrified line beyond the existing station. Since the existing track at Kirkby station makes interchange difficult, part of the expansion involves the construction of a new station in the Northwood area of the town.  This new facility, at Headbolt Lane - previously planned in the early 1970s but not built - would provide "turn-back" platforms for both diesel and electric services.  Exploratory technical assessments were carried out and Merseytravel had aspirations to construct the station as part of the Liverpool City Region Long Term Rail Strategy published in 2014.  In 2017 Merseytravel and Lancashire County Council announced they had committed £5 million to a study into the opening of a station at Headbolt Lane and also in Skelmersdale. The plan would cost an estimated £300 million taking a decade to deliver. Lancashire County Council agreed a plan to commission an outline business case in May 2019.

Liverpool City Region Combined Authority announced in August 2019 part of a £172m funding package to build a new station at Headbolt Lane.

References

Gallery

External links

Railway stations in the Metropolitan Borough of Knowsley
DfT Category E stations 
Former Lancashire and Yorkshire Railway stations
Railway stations served by Merseyrail
Northern franchise railway stations
Railway stations in Great Britain opened in 1848